Lieusaint is the name of several places in France:

Lieusaint, Manche, in the Manche département
Lieusaint, Seine-et-Marne, in the Seine-et-Marne département